This is a list of notable Romani people and people of Romani descent.

Activists  
Alba Flores – Spanish actress
Alfonso Mejia-Arias – Mexican musician and politician
Ceija Stojka – Austrian artist and writer
Constantin S. Nicolăescu-Plopșor – Romanian historian, archeologist, anthropologist and writer 
Delia Grigore – Romanian writer
Ian Hancock – English linguist
Katarina Taikon – Swedish actress and author
Marcel Courthiade – French linguist 
Milena Hübschmannová – Czech professor
Paul Polansky – American writer
Ronald Lee – Canadian writer 
Saša Barbul – Serbian actor and film director

Artists 
Sandra Jayat, French painter, poet and author
Damian Le Bas, English artist
Delaine Le Bas, English artist
Joe Machine, English painter
La Chunga, Spanish painter
Tracy Emin, English artist

Athletes

Boxers
Billy Joe Saunders – English
 Randolph Turpin – English
 Dick Turpin – English
Dorel Simion – Romanian 
Faustino Reyes – Spanish
Ivailo Marinov –  Bulgarian
Marian Simion – Romanian
Samuel Carmona Heredia – Spanish
Serafim Todorov – Bulgarian 
Zoltan Lunka –  Hungarian

Kickboxers
Nieky Holzken – Dutch
Václav Sivák – Czech

Professional Wrestlers
Gigi Dolin – American

Footballers
André-Pierre Gignac – French 
Artur Quaresma – Portuguese
Bănel Nicoliță – Romanian
Carlos Martins – Portuguese
Carlos Muñoz Cobo – Spanish  
Christos Patsatzoglou – Greek  
Dani Güiza – Spanish   
Dejan Savićević – Montenegrin
Diego Rodríguez – Spanish
Dragoslav Šekularac – Serbian 
Freddy Eastwood – Welsh
Georgi Ivanov - Gonzo – Bulgarian
Gigi Meroni – Italian 
István Pisont – Hungarian  
János Farkas – Hungarian
Jesús Navas – Spanish 
José Antonio Reyes – Spanish
José Mari – Spanish
Marius Lăcătuș – Romanian 
Milan Baroš – Czech
 Mykola Morozyuk
Lobo Carrasco – Spanish
Rab Howell – English 
Rafael van der Vaart – Dutch
Ricardo Quaresma – Portuguese   
Telmo Zarra – Spanish
Tony Vairelles – French 
Zvonimir Boban – Croatian

Hockey players
Dominik Lakatoš – Czech

Cinema and theater 
 Hiba Abouk – Spanish actress
 Sandro de América – Argentine actor
 Gratiela Brancusi – American-Romanian actress
 Yul Brynner – Russian-American actor and honorary president of the International Romani Union
 Michael Caine – English actor
 Jesús Castro- Spanish actor 
 Charlie Chaplin – English comic actor
 Jan Cina – Czech actor
 Joaquín Cortés – Spanish ballet and flamenco dancer
 Alba Flores – Spanish actress 
 Tony Gatlif – French film director
 Rita Hayworth – American actress
 Bob Hoskins – English actor
 Manoush – French actress
 Blanca Romero – Spanish actress
 Alina Șerban – Romanian actress
 Leonor Teles – Portuguese film director
 Tracey Ullman – British-American actress

Musicians
100 Kila – Bulgarian rapper
"Falete" Rafael Ojeda Rojas – Spanish singer
"Rayito" Antonio Rayo – Spanish guitarist, singer and composer. Father Gitano (Iberian Kalo) and mother Japanese
Adam Ant – English singer and musician
Adrian Minune – Romanian singer
Aggelopoulos Manolis (1939–1989) – Greek singer and actor
Albert Lee (born 1943) – London born and raised country rock guitar legend. His father is Romanichal. 
Antonio Flores (1961–1995) – Spanish singer-songwriter and actor
Azis - Bulgarian singer 
Biréli Lagrène (born 1966) – French jazz guitarist, violinist and bassist
Boban Marković – Serbian brass bandleader and trumpet player
Bódi Guszti – Hungarian musician
Camarón de la Isla (1950–1992) – Spanish flamenco singer
Carlos Montoya (1903–1993) – Spanish flamenco guitarist
Carmen Amaya – Spanish flamenco dancer
Cher Lloyd – English singer
Connect-R – Romanian singer
Denny Laine – British musician (The Moody Blues, Wings)
Didem – Turkish bellydancer
Diego el Cigala – Spanish flamenco singer
Django Reinhardt – French guitarist  
Drafi Deutscher – (1946–2006) German Sinto songwriter, singer and composer
Džej Ramadanovski (1964–2020) – born in Belgrade (former Yugoslavia), modern Serbian folk singer
Edyta Górniak (born 1972) – Polish singer
Elek Bacsik – Hungarian-American jazz guitarist and violinist
Elvis Presley – American, Rock and Roll
Esma Redzepova (1943–2016) – Macedonian singer and songwriter
Eugene Hütz – Ukrainian singer, guitarist, DJ and actor
Fanfare Ciocărlia (formed 1996) – Romanian brass band
Félix Lajkó (born 1974) – Hungarian-Serbian violinist and composer (part Romani)
Florin Salam – Romanian singer
Georges Cziffra (1921–1994) – Hungarian virtuoso pianist
Gigi Radics – Hungarian singer 
Haris Džinović (born 1951) – Bosnian folk singer 
Harri Stojka – Austrian jazz guitarist
Ion Voicu (1923–1997) – Romanian violinist and orchestral conductor, founder of Bucharest Chamber Orchestra
Irini Merkouri (born 1981) – Greek pop singer
Iva Bittová – Czech singer and violinist 
Ivo Papazov (born 1952) – Bulgarian jazz clarinetist
János Bihari – Hungarian violinist 
Jentina – English rapper
Jerry Mason – American singer, guitarist
Jimmy Rosenberg (born 1980) – Dutch swing guitarist
Joaquín Cortés – Spanish flamenco dancer
Joe Longthorne (born 1955) – English singer and impressionist
Joe Zawinul – Austrian jazz keyboardist
Johnny Răducanu (1931–2011) – Romanian jazz musician
Joy Olasunmibo Ogunmakin – Ayọ (stage name), German singer
Kal – Romani world music band from Serbia
Kibariye – Turkish singer of Romani descent
Lolita Flores (1958) – Spanish singer and actress
Los Niños de Sara – French (Spanish origin, Iberian Kale) rumba and flamenco singers and guitar players
Manitas de Plata (born 1921) – Spanish guitarist
Marianne Rosenberg (born 1955) – German singer-songwriter; daughter of German Gypsy who survived Auschwitz
Mariska Veres – Dutch singer
Mónika Lakatos – Hungarian singer
Natalia Jiménez – Spanish singer-songwriter
Nicole Cherry – Romanian singer 
Nicolae Guță – Romanian manele singer
Nicolae Neacşu ("Culai") – Lăutar, was the leader of Taraf de Haïdouks
Nicolas Reyes (born 1958) – Franco-Spanish singer, guitar player; lead singer for the Gipsy Kings, a band made up mostly of members of his extended family
Nikolai Shishkin – Russian guitarist and singer
Niña Pastori – Spanish flamenco singer
Panna Cinka (1711–1772) – Hungarian violinist, born in Kingdom of Hungary in modern Slovakia
Paulus Schafer (born 1978) – Dutch jazz guitarist
Pere Pubill Calaf "Peret" (1935–2014) – Catalan Spanish singer, guitar player and composer
Pista Dankó – Hungarian composer 
Radoslav Banga – of Czech group Gypsy.cz
Ramón Montoya (1889–1949) – Spanish flamenco guitarist
Remedios Amaya – Spanish singer
Robert Plant (born 1948) – English singer and songwriter (former vocalist of Led Zeppelin). Romanichal mother
Robi Botos – Hungarian-Canadian jazz pianist
Romica Puceanu (1928–1996) – Romanian singer (urban Lăutarească music)
Rosa López (born 1981) – Spanish singer
Rosario Flores (born 1963) – Spanish singer and actress, Latin Grammy award winner
Šaban Bajramović – Serbian singer
Sandu Ciorbă – Romanian singer
Sasha Kolpakov (born 1943) – Russian guitarist
Sinan Sakić – Serbian singer  
Sofi Marinova – Bulgarian singer
Sotis Volanis – Greek pop folk singer
Stochelo Rosenberg (born 19 February 1968) – Gypsy jazz guitarist who leads the Rosenberg Trio
Taisto Tammi – Finland
Taraful Haiducilor – (Taraf de Haïdouks) Romanian band, formed 1989
Toni Iordache – Romanian musician
Tonino Baliardo – Franco-Spanish guitar player; also a member of the Gipsy Kings
Valentina Ponomaryova (born 1939) – Russian singer
Věra Bílá – Czech vocalist 
Vicente Escudero – Spanish flamenco dancer
Wally Tax – Dutch rock singer, of The Outsiders; son of a Dutch father and a Russian Romani mother
Tzancă Uraganu – Romanian singer
Žarko Jovanović – Serbian musician

Politicians
Ágnes Osztolykán – Hungarian politician
Carlos Miguel – Portuguese minister and mayor
Idália Serrão – Portuguese secretary of state and MP
Juan de Dios Ramírez Heredia – Spanish MEP
Juscelino Kubitschek – 21st President of Brazil 
Lívia Járóka – Hungarian MEP
Washington Luís – 13th President of Brazil

Various
 Michael Costello – American fashion designer
 Ceferino Giménez Malla – Spanish beatified Roman Catholic catechist
 Timofey Prokofiev – Soviet marine infantryman, Hero of the Soviet Union
 Rodney Smith – English evangelist
 Mother Teresa  – Albanian nun
 Alfie Best – British businessman
 Francisco Rivera Ordóñez  – Spanish bullfighter

Writers
 Bronisława Wajs – Polish
 Caren Gussoff – American  
 Charlie Smith – English
 David Morley – English
 Elena Lacková – Slovak
 Hillary Monahan – American   
 Louise Doughty – English
 Mariella Mehr – Swiss
 Matéo Maximoff – French  
 Menyhért Lakatos – Hungarian
 Muharem Serbezovski – Macedonian
 Nina Dudarova – Russian
 Rajko Đurić – Serbian   
 Veijo Baltzar – Finnish  
 Hedina Tahirović-Sijerčić – Bosnian
 Vita Sackville-West – English

References

Lists of people by ethnicity
Romani-related lists